Stereocephalus is a genus of rove beetles from South America described by Félix Lynch Arribálzaga in 1884. Species occur in Argentina, Brazil, Paraguay and Venezuela.

Description

Species

References

Staphylinidae genera
Beetles of South America
Paederinae